Gadegast is a village and a former municipality in Wittenberg district in Saxony-Anhalt, Germany. Since 1 January 2011, it is part of the town Zahna-Elster. The municipality belonged to the administrative municipality (Verwaltungsgemeinschaft) of Elbaue-Fläming.

Geography
Gadegast lies about 17 km east of Lutherstadt Wittenberg.

History
Gadegast had its first documentary mention in 1385. In 1508, the name was written Gathegast, and in 1550 Gategast. The community lay until 1815 in the Saxon Amt of Seyda, whereafter it became Prussian.

In 1550, 32 men who owned property lived in the community, among them 18 gardeners who were directly under the Amt's authority. The village had its own court seat and judge. Moreover, it had its own parish church.

Also at that time, Gadegast bordered on the villages of Schadewalde, Mellnitz, Zallmsdorf and Seyda.

Economy and transportation
Federal Highway (Bundesstraße) B 187 between Jessen and Wittenberg lies 11 km to the south of the community.

References

Former municipalities in Saxony-Anhalt
Zahna-Elster